AJKF may refer to:
All Japan Kickboxing Federation - the Japan-based past sanctioning and promoting body of professional kickboxing
All Japan Kendo Federation - the organization which controls kendo, one of the Japanese swords martial arts